Adi Smolar (born 25 March 1959 in Slovenj Gradec, SR Slovenia, Yugoslavia) is a Slovenian singer-songwriter and composer.

He made his first appearance in 1981 with a full repertoire of his own songs. He continued to perform for eight years before releasing his first tape Naš svet se pa vrti (Our World Keeps Spinning) in 1989. He lives in Slovenj Gradec.

Albums 
 Naš svet se pa vrti (Our World Keeps Spinning) {1989}
 No ja, pa kaj (Eh, So What?) {1993}
 Neprilagojen (Maladjusted) {1994}
 Bognedaj, da bi crknu televizor (God Forbid The TV'd Stop Working) {1995}
 Saj te prime - pa te mine (We All Go Through It) {1996}
 Jaz sem nor (I'm Nuts) {1997}
 Od A do S (From A To S) {1998}
 Je treba delat (We All Have To Work) {1999}
 Jaz ne grem v šolo (I am not going to school) {2000}
 Ne se bat' (Don't Be Scared) {2001}
 Koncert - v živo (Concert – Live) {2002}
 Vse je krasno (Everything's Just Fine) {2004}
 Brez dlake na jeziku (Telling The Truth) {2008}
 Se počasi daleč pride (Take it Easy and You'll Go a Long Way) {2011}
 Prvih pet (First Five) {2008} – Compilation

References 

Living people
1959 births
People from Slovenj Gradec
Slovenian composers
Male composers
Slovenian guitarists
Slovenian singer-songwriters
Slovenian male musicians